Marizen Marais (born 17 May 1996) is a field hockey player from South Africa. In 2020, she was an athlete at the Summer Olympics.

Personal life
Marizen Marais is graduated from the University of Pretoria.

Career

Under–21
Marais made her debut for the South Africa U–21 team in 2016, at the Junior Africa Cup in Windhoek. After gaining qualification to the FIH Junior World Cup, she went on to represent the team at the tournament in Santiago.

National team
Marais made her senior international debut for South Africa in 2016, during the first edition of the Cape Town Summer Series.

In 2019, Marais was a member of the team at the FIH Series Finals in Valencia.

Following a string of good performances, Marais was named to the South Africa team for the 2020 Summer Olympics in Tokyo. She will make her Olympic debut on 24 July 2021, in the Pool A match against Ireland.

References

External links

1996 births
Living people
Female field hockey midfielders
South African female field hockey players
Field hockey players at the 2020 Summer Olympics
Olympic field hockey players of South Africa
Field hockey players at the 2014 Summer Youth Olympics
TuksHockey Club players
University of Pretoria alumni
Crusaders Hockey Club players
20th-century South African women
21st-century South African women
Field hockey players at the 2022 Commonwealth Games